Daniela Moté de Souza Carneiro (born 10 February 1976 in Italva), also known as Daniela do Waguinho, is a Brazilian pedagogue and politician affiliated to Brazil Union (UNIÃO). She is currently a licensed congresswoman and Minister of Tourism.

Political career
In 2003, she worked at the Municipal Secretariat of Education of Rio de Janeiro. After that, Carneiro worked at the Municipal Secretariat of Social Assistance and Citizenship of the same city.

Between February 2017 and March 2018, Daniela had served as Municipal Secretary of Social Assistance and Citizenship of Belford Roxo during the first term of her husband, Wagner dos Santos Carneiro.

Chamber of Deputies (2019–2022)
In the 2018 Rio de Janeiro state election, Daniela was elected for the Chamber representing the state and becoming the most voted candidate of her party of the state, the Brazilian Democratic Movement (MDB), and the most voted candidate for the Chamber in Belford Roxo, with 136,286 votes. In the 2022 state elections, Daniela was re-elected as the most voted candidate, with a total of 213,706 votes.

Ministry of Tourism
In December 2022, Daniela was announced as Minister of Tourism of the third Lula administration, assuming office on 1 January 2023.

Electoral history

Personal life
Daniela is married to the incumbent mayor of Belford Roxo, Wagner dos Santos Carneiro, known as Waguinho, and is mother of two sons: Nathan and Callebe.

She is also graduate in Pedagogy with specialization in Educational Orientation and is also post-graduate in Psychomotricity.

References

External links
 
 
 

1976 births
Living people
Brazil Union politicians
Ministers of Tourism of Brazil
Members of the Chamber of Deputies (Brazil) from Rio de Janeiro (state)
Women government ministers of Brazil
21st-century Brazilian women politicians
People from Bedford Roxo